Warm is a 1969 album by Herb Alpert & the Tijuana Brass. It reached number 28 on the Billboard 200 album chart.

Background
Warm was a vast departure from previous Tijuana Brass albums and featured much slower-paced songs, leaning more toward a Brazilian type of sound. At this point in his career, Alpert had grown tired of the band's previous style of music, feeling that it was repetitive, and wanted to try a different direction. 

The opening track, "The Sea Is My Soil", is among the longest songs ever released by the Tijuana Brass at four and a half minutes, while two songs on the album feature lead vocals by Alpert ("Without Her" and "To Wait for Love"), all of which were released as singles.

Critical reception

In his review for Allmusic, music critic Richard S. Ginell called the album mellow, richly textured, but noted it "couldn't crack the Top 20, for the Brass' cross-generational appeal was fading fast."

Track listing

References

1969 albums
Herb Alpert albums
Albums produced by Herb Alpert
Albums produced by Jerry Moss
A&M Records albums